England team or Team England may refer to:

England national football team
England cricket team
England national rugby union team
England national rugby league team
England national basketball team (disambiguation)
England national beach soccer team
England national badminton team
England national korfball team
England national futsal team
Team England (roller derby)
 teamengland.org, the website of Commonwealth Games England